Brighton Beach Motordrome, also known as the Brighton Beach Stadium, was a racing facility in Brighton Beach, New York. The Motordrome was originally named the Brighton Beach Race-Course, and became the Brighton Beach Motordrome in 1909. In 1915 A. H. Patterson took over as the proprietor of the racetrack.

Records
In 1913 Arthur Chapple and Henri St. Yves set the fifty-minute team speed record for motorcycles, traveling 67 miles.
In 1917 Clarence Carman set the 10 mile bicycle speed record with a pace car, traveling the distance in 12:29.2.

Notable people
 

André Grapperon, champion motorcycle racer

Footnotes

Brighton Beach
Motorsport venues in New York (state)
1909 establishments in New York City
Sports venues in Brooklyn